The 182nd Pennsylvania House of Representatives District is located in Philadelphia and has been represented since 2023 by Ben Waxman.

District profile
The 182nd Pennsylvania House of Representatives District is located in Philadelphia County and encompasses the One Liberty Observation Deck and the Pennsylvania Academy of the Fine Arts. It also includes the following areas:

 Ward 02 [PART, Divisions 02, 03, 04, 05, 06, 07, 08, 09, 10, 11, 12, 13, 14, 17, 18, 19, 20, 21, 22, 23 and 24]
 Ward 05 [PART, Divisions 06, 07, 08, 09, 11, 14, 22, 28 and 29]
 Ward 08

Recent election results

2010

2012

2014

2016

2018

2020

References

External links
District map from the United States Census Bureau
Pennsylvania House Legislative District Maps from the Pennsylvania Redistricting Commission.  
Population Data for District 182 from the Pennsylvania Redistricting Commission.

Government of Philadelphia
182